The term state actor (in German: Staatsschauspieler) has had different meanings in recent German history. In Nazi Germany, it was the highest title that could be awarded to a stage actor. Since 1945, the meaning has changed. In Baden-Württemberg, it is no longer simply a title of honor, but an official position.

Nazi era

The honor of being a Staatsschauspieler, or State Actor, was awarded by Joseph Goebbels, the Reich Minister for Popular Enlightenment and Propaganda. It was a purely honorary title, which had no pecuniary benefits. Under the Nazis, important stage actors  were always used in films - that should be upgraded in this way for the major media propaganda - were the winners of the audience on a regular basis as a film actor known. Pure film stars, however, had no prospect of being awarded the title.

Bearer of the title in Nazi Germany (selection) 

Willy Birgel (1937)
Hans Brausewetter (1939)
Lina Carstens (1939)
Lil Dagover (1937)
Paul Dahlke (1937)
René Deltgen (1939)
Karl Ludwig Diehl (1939)
Albert Florath (1938)
Heinrich George (1937)
Alexander Golling (1938?)
Gustaf Gründgens (1934)
Lucie Höflich (1937)
Emil Jannings (1936)
Fritz Kampers (1939)
Friedrich Kayßler
Eugen Klöpfer (1934)
Maria Koppenhöfer (1943)
Werner Krauss (1934)
Hans Leibelt (1934)
Wolfgang Liebeneiner (1942)
Theodor Loos (1937)
Bernhard Minetti (1938)
Paul Otto (1937)
Erich Ponto (1938)
Johannes Riemann (1939)
Heinz Rühmann (1940)
Josef Sieber (1938)
Emmy Sonnemann (1934)
Hermann Thimig (1938)
Olga Tschechowa (1936)
Hedwig Wangel (1939)
Paul Wegener (1937)
Mathias Wieman (1937)
Marianne Hoppe

Federal Republic of Germany 

Since the end of the Second World War the title of "state actor" is awarded by Berlin and Hamburg Senates, and by the states of Bavaria, Saarland and Baden-Württemberg.

Bearer of the Baden-Wuerttemberg title (selection) 

Robert Bürkner
Just Gerhard (1972)
Werner Schramm (1972)

Bearer of the Bavarian title (selection) 

Gustl Bayrhammer
Martin Benrath
Toni Berger
Hans Clarin
Max Griesser
Thomas Holtzmann
Elfriede Kuzmany
Karl Lieffen
Ursula Lingen
Elisabeth Orth
Christine Ostermayer
Hans-Michael Rehberg
Fritz Strassner
Adolf Ziegler

Bearer of the Berlin title (selection) 

Martin Held (1963)
Carl Raddatz (1963)
Erich Schellow (1963)
Siegmar Schneider (1963)
Hans Sohnker (1968)
Friedrich W. Bauschulte (1970)
Horst Bollmann (1970)

Bearer of the Saarland title (selection) 
 Hans-Georg Körbel
 Christiane Motter

References 

Nazi culture
Theatre in Germany
German culture